

References

Environment of the East Riding of Yorkshire
Sports venues in the East Riding of Yorkshire
Yorkshire, East Riding
King